Sigurd Hofmann (15 February 1944 – 17 June 2022) was a physicist known for his work on superheavy elements.

Biography 

Hofmann discovered his love for physics at the Max Planck High School in Groß-Umstadt, Germany, where he graduated in 1963. He studied physics at the Technical University in Darmstadt (Diploma, 1969, and thesis at the Institute of Nuclear Physics  with Egbert Kankeleit and Karl Wien, 1974). From 1974 to 1989 he was responsible for the detection and identification of nuclei produced in heavy ion reactions at the velocity separator SHIP (Separator for Heavy Ion reaction Products) at the GSI Helmholtz Centre for Heavy Ion Research. He was working in the Department Nuclear Chemistry II headed by Peter Armbruster. From 1989 he was leading, after Gottfried Münzenberg, the experiments for the synthesis of new elements. From 1998 he was Honorary Professor at the Goethe-Universität in Frankfurt am Main.

He was the leading scientist with the discovery experiments of the chemical elements darmstadtium (Ds, atomic number 110),  roentgenium (Rg, 111) and copernicium (Cn, 112). He made substantial contributions to the discovery experiments of the elements bohrium (Bh, 107), hassium (Hs, 108)  and meitnerium (Mt, 109). He participated in the discovery of the element flerovium (Fl, 114) at the Flerov Laboratory of Nuclear Reactions (FLNR) in Dubna, Russia, and his research group confirmed data measured on the synthesis of the elements flerovium and livermorium (Lv, 116) at FLNR. He identified many new isotopes located at the proton drip-line, among those the isotope 151Lu, the first case of radioactive emission of protons from the ground-state of a nucleus. His speciality was nuclear spectroscopy and heavy ion reactions.

Awards 

 1984 "Physics Award" of the German Physical Society (together with Gottfried Münzenberg, Willibrord Reisdorf and Karl-Heinz Schmidt)
 1996 Otto Hahn Prize of the City of Frankfurt am Main (together with Gottfried Münzenberg)
 1996 "Doctor honoris causa" of the Faculty of Mathematics and Physics, Comenius University of Bratislava, Slovakia
 1997 "G.N. Flerov Prize" of the Joint Institute for Nuclear Research (JINR) in Dubna, Russia
 1998 "Honorary Professor" of the Goethe University in Frankfurt am Main, Germany
 1998 "SUN-AMCO Medal" of the International Union of Pure and Applied Physics
 2001 "Doctor honoris causa" of the Joint Institute for Nuclear Research (JINR) in Dubna, Russia
 2002 "First Prize" of the Joint Institute for Nuclear Research (JINR) in Dubna, Russia
 2004 "Distinguished Professor" of the Josef Buchmann Foundation and the Department of Physics of the Goethe University in Frankfurt am Main, Germany
 2006 "Roentgen Medal" of the City of Remscheid-Lennep, Germany, place of birth of Conrad Roentgen
 2009 "Helmholtz Professor" of the Helmholtz Association of German Research Centres (HGF) 
 2011 "Nicolaus Copernicus Medal" of the Polish Academy of Sciences in Warsaw, Poland
 2011 "Medal of the City of Torun" and Nicolaus Copernicus University in Torun, Poland

Memberships 

 German Physical Society
 Academia Europaea
 Member of the Russian Academy of Natural Sciences
 Foreign member of the Polish Academy of Arts and Sciences

Literature 

 Sigurd Hofmann: On Beyond Uranium – Journey to the end of the Periodic Table. In: Science Spectra Book Series, Volume 2, V. Moses, Series Editor,  (hardback),  (paperback), Taylor and Francis, London and New York, 2002, 216 Seiten, online 
 Sigurd Hofmann: Synthesis of superheavy elements by cold fusion. Radiochimica Acta Band 99, 2011, S. 405–428, online
 Sigurd Hofmann and Gottfried Münzenberg: The discovery of the heaviest elements. In: Reviews of Modern Physics, Band 72, 200, S. 733-767, online
 Sigurd Hofmann: Proton radioactivity. In: Nuclear decay modes, D.N. Poenaru, Editor, IOP Publishing Ltd, 1996, S. 143-203

External links 

 Sigurd Hofmann: Physics experiments on superheavy elements at the GSI-SHIP. In: The 4th International Conference on the Chemistry and Physics of the Transactinide Elements. In: Sochi, Russia, 6.–10. September, 2011, online
 Martyn Poliakoff of the University of Nottingham, UK, at GSI: online

References

Discoverers of chemical elements
Members of Academia Europaea
Foreign Members of the Russian Academy of Natural Sciences
Technische Universität Darmstadt alumni
20th-century German physicists
21st-century German physicists
1944 births
2022 deaths